Dávid Sinkovits (born 7 May 1998) is a Serbian-born Hungarian footballer who plays as a defensive midfielder for Szentlőrinci SE on loan from TSC Bačka Topola.

References

External links
 Dávid Sinkovits at Srbijafudbal
 

1998 births
Living people
Sportspeople from Subotica
Serbian footballers
Hungarian footballers
Hungarians in Vojvodina
Association football midfielders
FK Spartak Subotica players
FK TSC Bačka Topola players
Szentlőrinci SE footballers
Serbian First League players
Nemzeti Bajnokság II players